DeSoto Heliport  is a city-owned public heliport in DeSoto, Dallas County, Texas, United States, located  north of the central business district. The heliport has no IATA or ICAO designation.

The facility opened in August 2014 under joint ownership by the City of DeSoto, the Texas Department of Transportation, and the DeSoto Economic Development Corporation.
It is operated by SKY Helicopters, which also operates the Garland/DFW Heloplex.

Facilities 
 H1: 54 x 54 ft. (16 x 16 m), Surface: Concrete

In the year ending 31 December 2018, 6 helicopters were based at the heliport, but there were no reported aircraft operations.

References

External links 
 Official website
 DeSoto Heliport at SKY Helicopters
  at Texas DOT Airport Directory

Airports in Texas
Airports in the Dallas–Fort Worth metroplex
Transportation in Dallas County, Texas